The  is a Japanese recipe book published in 1782 during the Edo period.  The author's name is given as Seikyōdōjin Kahitsujun; it is thought his real name was Sodani Gakusen (1738–1797), a seal-engraver from Osaka. It lists 100 recipes for preparing tofu. Due to its immense popularity, two successor volumes were published: Tōfu hyakuchin zokuhen (豆腐百珍続編) and Tōfu hyakuchin yōroku (豆腐百珍余録).

References

External links 
List of recipes (Japanese)

1782 non-fiction books
Early Modern cookbooks
Japanese cookbooks
Tofu
Edo period